Isidora Žebeljan (27 September 1967 – 29 September 2020) was a Serbian composer and conductor. She was a professor of composition at the Belgrade Music Academy and a member of the Serbian Academy of Sciences and Arts.

She won many national awards for her music, among them the Stevan Mokranjac National Music Award in 2004.

Biography
Isidora Žebeljan studied Composition at the Faculty of Music in Belgrade with Vlastimir Trajković (a student of Olivier Messiaen). She was Professor of Composition at the same Faculty from 2002. Her work as a composer earned her several significant awards in her country, including the Mokranjac Award in 2004. She won the New York Civitella Ranieri Foundation Fellowship for 2005. In 2006 she was elected to the Serbian Academy of Sciences and Arts (becoming a full member in 2012) and in 2012 she was elected to the World Academy of Art and Science (WAAS). In 2014 she received a Parliamentary Assembly of the Mediterranean Award for her achievement in art.

She attracted international attention with her opera Zora D. which was commissioned by the Genesis Foundation from London. The opera was premiered in Amsterdam in 2003 directed by David Pountney and Nicola Raab. The same production opened the 50th season of the Vienna Chamber Opera in 2003.

Isidora Žebeljan got commissions from important institutions and festivals, such as: 
the Venice Biennale (The Horses of Saint Mark, illumination for orchestra, 2004), 
Bregenz Festival (opera The Marathon; Hum away, hum away, for String orchestra), 
Genesis Foundation, London (for the opening of Bill Viola's exhibition 'The Passion' at the National Gallery in London in 2003), 
University of Kent, 
Muziektheater im Revier Gelsenkirchen (opera Simon the Chosen), 
International Horn Society, 
Accademia Musicale Chigiana, Siena (opera Two Heads and a Girl), 
City of London Festival

She composed works for musical ensembles of high standing, such as the Wiener Symphoniker, The Academy of St. Martin in the Fields, the Brodsky Quartet, Berlin Philharmonic Octet, Dutch Chamber Choir and London Brass. Her compositions were regularly performed throughout Europe, Israel, USA and Asia including the Venice Biennale, Bregenz Festival, Festival RAI Nuova Musica, City of London Festival, ISCM Festivals (Gothenburg, Wrocław), Festival Classique The Hague, Galway Arts Festival, Tallinn Summer Music Festival, WDR-Musikfest, Settembre musica Milano-Torino, Ultima Festival (Oslo), Swaledale Festival, Walled City Music Festival, Dulwich Music Festival (UK), Eilat Festival (Jerusalem), Festival Nous Sons (Barcelona), Festival L' Est (Milano), Crossing Border Festival (The Netherlands), Settimana Musicale Senese, Musical Biennale Zagreb, BEMUS (Belgrade), etc. Among the ensembles and musicians who performed music of Isidora Žebeljan are the Gothenburg Symphony Orchestra, Symphony Orchestra of RAI Torino, Real Filharmonía de Galicia, Janáček Philharmonic Orchestra, I Solisti Veneti, Neue Philharmonie Westfalen, No Borders Orchestra, Lutosławski Quartet, Nieuw Ensemble (Amsterdam), Zagros Ensemble (Helsinki), ensemble Sentieri Selvaggi (Milan), conductors Paul Daniel, Claudio Scimone, David Porcelijn, Christoph Poppen, Pierre-André Valade, pianists Kyoko Hashimoto and Aleksandar Madžar, hornist Stefan Dohr, clarinetists Joan Enric Lluna and Alessandro Carbonare, violinist Daniel Rowland and others.

Isidora Žebeljan was also one of the most prominent Serbian contemporary composers of theatre and film music. She has composed music for more than thirty theatre productions in all significant theatres in Serbia, Norway, Croatia and Montenegro. For her work in the field of theatre music she was awarded the Sterija Award three times. She was also awarded the Yustat Biennial of Stage Design Award for best theatre music four times. In addition, Isidora Žebeljan worked on a number of film scores, including the orchestration of Goran Bregović's music for the films Time of the Gypsies, Arizona Dream and Underground (directed by Emir Kusturica), La Reine Margot (directed by Patrice Chéreau) and The Serpent's Kiss (directed by Philippe Rousselot). She composed the music for Miloš Radivojević's film How I was Stolen by the Germans. For this score she was awarded the Prize of the Film Festival in Sopot in 2011 (Serbia) and the FIPRESCI Prize of the Serbian Film Association in 2012.

Isidora Žebeljan also regularly appeared as a performer (conductor and pianist) of her own works and of the works by other, mainly Serbian composers. She conducted concerts in London (with The Academy of St Martin in the Fields) and in Amsterdam (Muziekgebouw aan 't IJ), and performed as a pianist with the Brodsky Quartet.

In 2017, Isidora Žebeljan signed the Declaration on the Common Language of the Croats, Serbs, Bosniaks and Montenegrins.

She died on 29 September 2020 in Belgrade, Serbia.

Recordings
In 2012, the CD label Classic Produktion Osnabrück (CPO) from Germany released a CD with her orchestral music, performed by the Janáček Philharmonic Orchestra, Žebeljan Orchestra and conductor David Porcelijn (CPO 7776702). In 2015 the same CD label released a CD with her chamber music for strings, played by the Brodsky Quartet (CPO 777994-2). In 2013 the CD label Oboe Classics from London released a CD Balkan Bolero with her chamber music for winds (11 compositions). Other CD's with music of Isidora Žebeljan were released by the CD labels Deutsche Grammophon (The Horses of Saint Mark by No Borders Orchestra), Chandos Records (UK), Mascom Records (Serbia), Acousense (Germany), etc.

Reception
Describing Žebeljan's music, David Pountney wrote:

Music
The exclusive publisher of her music is Ricordi-Universal.

Compositions

2003–2017

1993–2002

1985–1992

Incidental music
Erlend Loe: Doppler; Production: Trøndelag Teater, Trondheim (Norwegen), 2016 – for reeds, oboe, cor anglais, ocarina's, tuba, double bass, bass guitar, ukulele, piano, percussion and  elektronic. Director: Tomi Janežič.
Anton Pavlovich Chekhov: Seagull; production of the Serbian National Theatre in Novi Sad, 2012 – for singers, flute/piccolo, oboe, trompet, double bass, percussion and piano. Director: Tomi Janežič.
Uglješa Šajtinac: Banat; production of the Yugoslav Drama Theatre, 2007 – for oboe, English horn, violin, cello and piano. Director: Dejan Mijač. (CD 'Illuminations')
Thomas Bernhard: Heldenplatz; production of the "Atelje 212" Theatre in Belgrade, 2006 – for string quartet and piano. Director: Dejan Mijač. (CD 'Illuminations')
Anton Pavlovich Chekhov: Three Sisters; production of the National Theatre in Belgrade, 2006 – for violin and piano. Director: Vida Ognjenović.
Peter Shaffer: Amadeus; production of Croatian National Theatre "Ivan pl. Zajc", Rijeka (Croatia), 2006 – for soprano and harpsichord. Director: Tomi Janežič.
Biljana Srbljanović: Locusts; production of the Yugoslav Drama Theatre, 2005 – for soprano and electronic. Director: Dejan Mijač.
William Shakespeare: King Lear; production of the "Atelje 212" Theatre in Belgrade, 2005 – for prepared piano. Director: Tomi Janežič. (CD 'Illuminations')
Slobodan Šnajder: The Bride of the Wind; production of the National Theatre in Belgrade, 2003 – for female voice, English horn, violoncello, double bass and keyboards. Director: Boris Miljković. (CD 'Illuminations')
Martin Crimp: The Country; production of the National Theatre in Belgrade, 2002 – for electronic. (CD 'Illuminations')
Ljubomir Simović: The Miracle in Schargan; production of the "Atelje 212" Theatre in Belgrade, 2002 – for piano, percussion and chamber orchestra. Director: Dejan Mijač. (CD 'Illuminations')
Vida Ognjenović: Mileva Einstein; production of the National Theatre in Belgrade, 2001 – for flute, clarinet, violin, viola, double bass and piano. Director: Vida Ognjenović. (CD 'Illuminations')
William Shakespeare: The Tempest; production of the City Theatre Budva Festival (Montenegro), 2001 – for flute, clarinet, trumpet, soprano voice, violin, violoncello, double bass, keyboards and percussions. Director: Slobodan Unkovski. (CD 'Illuminations')
Hugo Betti: The Crime on the Goat Island; production of the City Theatre Budva Festival, Montenegro, 2001 – for electronic. Director: Nebojša Bradić.
Miroslav Krleža: Leda; production of the "Atelje 212" Theatre in Belgrade, 2001 – for violin, soprano and alto saxophone, trumpet, piano, drums and double bass. Director: Dejan Mijač. (CD 'Illuminations')
Vida Ognjenović: Jegor's Road; production of the City Theatre Budva Festival (Montenegro), 2000 – for flute, clarinet, violin, viola, piano and double bass
Jean Paul Sartre: Dirty Hands; production of the Yugoslav Drama Theatre, 2000 – for trumpet, piano, violin, viola and violoncello
Radoslav Pavlović: Eleven Weeks; production of the Yugoslav Drama Theatre, 2000 – techno music
Franz Xaver Kroetz: The Impuls; production of the "Atelje 212" Theatre in Belgrade, 2000 – techno music
Anton Pavlovich Chekhov: The Cherry Orchard; production of the Yugoslav Drama Theatre, 2000 – for piano and string quartet (CD 'Illuminations')
Alexander Dumas / Stevan Koprivica: The Three Musketeers; production of the "Boško Buha" Theatre in Belgrade, 1999 – for flute, trumpet, violin, guitar, piano, female voice, double bass and percussion (CD 'Illuminations')
Miodrag Karadžić: You Just Go and We Will Croak and Howl; production of the Belgrade Dramatic Theatre, 1999 – for violin, accordion, clarinet, piano and double bass
Ivo Andrić / Nebojša Bradić: The Damned Yard; production of the National Theatre in Kruševac, 1999 – for female voice, mixed choir, flute, clarinet, violin, piano and double bass
Mirjana Bobić Mojsilović: Tears Are O.K.; production of the National Theatre in Belgrade, 1999 – for female voice, alto saxophone, violin, piano and double bass (CD 'Illuminations')
Ljubivoje Ršumović: Emperor Trayan Had Goat's Ears; production of the "Boško Buha" Theatre in Belgrade, 1999 – for female voice, female and mixed choir, pipes, violin, flute, piano, double bass and percussion (CD 'Illuminations')
Maksim Gorky: The Philistines; production of the Belgrade Drama Theatre, 1998 – for string quartet
Molière: The School for Women; production of the Montenegro National Theatre, Pogrorica (Montenegro), 1998 – for male voice, violin, clarinet, bass clarinet, piano and double bass (CD 'Illuminations')
Georg Büchner: Leonce and Lena; co production of the City Theatre Budva Festival (Montenegro) and the Yugoslav Drama Theatre, 1998 – for soprano voice, flute, oboe, viola, piano, double bass, tubular bells and tom-toms (CD 'Illuminations')
Jeremy Brack: Oliver Twist; production of the "Boško Buha" Theatre in Belgrade, 1998 – for violin, clarinet, E flat clarinet, bass clarinet, piano and double bass
Arthur Miller: All My Sons; production of the Belgrade Drama Theatre, 1998 – for piano and string quartet
Goran Marković: Speech Impediment; production of the National Theatre in Belgrade, 1997 – for trumpet, piano, double bass and drums
Richard Brinsley Sheridan: The Rivals; production of the Belgrade Drama Theatre, 1997 – for violin, piano, bassoon and double bass
Berthold Brecht: A Man Is A Man; production of the Belgrade Drama Theatre, 1996 – for violin, alto saxophone, guitar, accordion, piano, drums and double bass
Agatha Christie: The Mousetrap; production of the Belgrade Drama Theatre, 1995 – for violin, alto saxophone and piano (CD 'Illuminations')
Frank Wedekind: Spring's Awakening; production of the National Theatre in Kragujevac, 1990 – for electronic
Dušan Kovačević: Hilarious Tragedy; production of the National Theatre in Šabac, 1989 – for electronic
Dušan Kovačević: The Professional; production of the National Theatre in Šabac, 1989 – for electronic
Dubravka Ugrešić: Life is a Fairy Tale; production of the Student Cultural Centre, Belgrade, 1987 – for electronic

Film scores
How I was stolen by the Germans, directed by Miloš Radivojević, 2010 – for cello and piano
Don't Know When or How or Where, documentary directed by Želimir Gvardiol, 1993 – for violin, alto saxophone, piano and double bass
Big Small Graduation, directed by Mina Stanojević, 1990 – for female and male voices, electric guitar, piano and drums
Maria Like You, directed by Mina Stojanović, 1986 – for female voice, electric guitar, piano and drums

Discography
CPO, Germany, 777994-2 (2015); Brodsky Quartet plays Isidora Žebeljan; 'Song of a Traveller in the Night', Chamber Music
DEUTSCHE GRAMMOPHON, 481 107-3 (2015); Isidora Žebeljan; The Horses of Saint Mark, illumination for orchestra
COMPOSERS ASSOCIATION OF SERBIA (2015); Fieriness, Serbian music for piano trio; Isidora Žebeljan
MASCOM Records, Serbia, LC 29730, CD 290 (2014); Isidora Žebeljan; Zora D, opera in one act (seven scenes)
OBOE CLASSICS, UK, CC 2028 (2013); Balkan Bolero; Chamber music by Isidora Žebeljan
MASCOM Records, Serbia, LC 29730, CD 217 (2013); Isidora Žebeljan; Illuminations, Music for Theatre
B92, Serbia, CD 116 (2008); Isidora Žebeljan; Illuminations, Music for Theatre
SANU, Serbia (2011); Muzika kompozitora – akademika SANU
COMPOSERS ASSOCIATION OF SERBIA (2013); Women's Stories, Serbian piano music
Muzika klasika, Music Magazine for Classical Music, No. 3 (2011)
Belgrade Strings; Anthology of 20th Century Serbian Music for Strings (noncommercial edition, 2006) (CD No. 2)
Teatro Comunale di Monfalcone, Italy (2005); Sentieri selvaggi dal vivo; Isidora Žebeljan: A Yawl on the Danube, scene for soprano, piano, percussion and string quartet
Genesis Foundation, London, UK (noncommercial edition, 2002); The Genesis Prizes for Opera; Work in Progress Presentations 2002; Isidora Žebeljan: an extract from the opera Zora D.

Significant works
Operas: Zora D; The Marathon; Simon, the Chosen; Two Heads and a Girl; Simon the Foundling
Orchestral music: The Horses of Saint Mark; Hum away, hum away strings; Escenas picaras; Deserted Village
Orchestral music with soloists: Rukoveti, five songs for soprano and orchestra; New Songs of Lada, for soprano and string orchestra (or string quartet); Dance of the Wooden Sticks, for French horn (or cor anglais) and *String orchestra (or string quintet); Pipe and Flamingos, concerto for clarinet and orchestra
Chamber music: Song of a Traveller in the Night, for clarinet and string quartet; Polomka quartet, for string quartet; Simon and Anne, suite for cello (or cor anglais) and piano;  Needle Soup, for octet
Vocal music: Latum lalo, for mixed choir; Pep it up, fantasy for soprano and chamber ensemble; When God created Dubrovnik, song for Mezzo-soprano and string quartet
Piano music: Umbra, Il Circo

Awards
Parliamentary Assembly of the Mediterranean Award, in acknowledgement of her artistic achievements in the musical field in the Mediterranean region, 2014.
Musica Classica Magazine Award for the best composer of the year 2013 (for the opera Two Heads and a Girl), 2014.
Full member of the Serbian Academy of Sciences and Arts., 2012.
Award for the best original score at the 40th Film Festival in Sopot (Serbia), for the movie How I was Stolen by the Germans, directed by Miloš Radivojevic, 2011.
Belgrade's daily newspapers Danas has pronounced Isidora Žebeljan The person of the decade in music, 2010.
Berlin's weekly magazine Der Freitag has listed Isidora Žebeljan for the ten most promising public figures in the world for the year 2009.
Sterija's award at the 51st 'Sterija' Theatre Festival (Sterijino pozorje), Novi Sad, for the original score for the play Skakavci by Biljana Srbljanovic, production of the Yugoslav Drama Theatre, Belgrade, 2007.
Elected the youngest member of the Serbian Academy of Sciences and Arts, 2006.
Gorki list Creativity Award for creativity in culture and arts, 2005.
The fellowship of the Civitella Ranineri Foundation, New York, 2005.
'Stevan Mokranjac' Award – the Serbian Government Music Award, for the opera Zora D, 2004.
Grand Prix YUSTAT-The Fourth Biennale of Theatre Design for the original score for the play The Miracle in Schargan by Ljubomir Simovic, production of the "Atelje 212" Theatre, Belgrade, 2002.
Vasilije Mokranjac's Foundation Award, Belgrade, for the composition Rukoveti, five songs for soprano and orchestra, 2001..
Sterija's award at the 45th 'Sterija' Theatre Festival (Sterijino pozorje), Novi Sad for the original score for the play Jegor's Road by Vida Ognjenovic, production of the Budva City Theatre Festival, Montenegro, 2001.
Grand Prix for the original score for the play The Three Musketeers by Alexander Dumas/Stevan Koprivica, at the Children Theatre Festival, Kotor, Montenegro, production of the "Boško Buha" Theatre, Belgrade, 2000.
Grand Prix YUSTAT-The Third Biennale of Theatre Design for the original score for the play Leonce and Lena by Georg Büchner, production of the Budva City Theatre Festival and the Yugoslav Drama Theatre, Belgrade, 2000.. 
Sterija's award at the 42nd 'Sterija' Theatre Festival (Sterijino pozorje), Novi Sad, for the original score for the play Speech Impediment by Goran Markovic, production of the National Theatre, Belgrade, 1998.
Grand Prix YUSTAT, the Second Biennale of Theatre Design for the original score, 1998.
Grand Prix YUSTAT, the First Biennale of Theatre Design for the original score for the play A Man Is A Man by Berthold Brecht, production of the Belgrade Drama Theatre, 1996.

References

External links
 Isidora Žebeljan website
 Isidora Žebeljan 2015 Isidora Žebeljan's website (previous version, archived)
 Opernnetz.com: Oper experimentell
 Guardian.co.uk: National's first major video show inspires awe
 Giornaledellamusica.it: Espressionismo balcanico- Musica dai ritmi incessanti e azione a non finire per un teatro musicale appassionante- Neue Oper Wien Isidora Zebeljan 22 Ottobre 2008
 Ricord.it
 Sorekartists.com
 Genesisfoundation.com
 Моја музика, моја истина (tr. "My music, my truth")
 Желела сам да „пишем” као Прокофјев (tr. "I wanted to "write" like Prokofiev") 
 Isidora Žebeljan: Sačuvala sam radost stvaranja (tr. "Isidora Žebeljan: I have preserved the joy of creation")
 Како је Наход Симон привукао Немце (tr. "How Nahod Simon attracted the Germans")

 Second imdb entry

Serbian composers
1967 births
2020 deaths
Musicians from Belgrade
Serbian classical pianists
Serbian conductors (music)
Women classical composers
Women conductors (music)
21st-century conductors (music)
21st-century classical pianists
21st-century women composers
Signatories of the Declaration on the Common Language
21st-century classical composers
21st-century Serbian musicians
20th-century conductors (music)
20th-century classical pianists
20th-century women composers
20th-century Serbian musicians
20th-century women pianists
21st-century women pianists